Lafange is a 1975 Bollywood film directed by Harmesh Malhotra. It stars Randhir Kapoor, Mumtaz, Pran in lead roles and music by Laxmikant-Pyarelal. The film became a hit.

Plot
Beautiful Sapna lives with her wealthy father, Dhanraj, and a younger brother in a palatial house. Her father comes across some valuable diamonds and conceals them in a secret place. While driving one day, Dhanraj is killed, but her brother escapes without any injuries, but loses control of his vocal chords unable to tell anyone how the accident occurred, and goes missing. After Sapna wins a beauty contest, she travels to Bombay and meets with a young wheel-chair bound soldier named Gopal, and both fall in love with each other. What Sapna does not know is that Gopal is a fraud, a con-man who is only after her money. Then her life is even more complicated after she finds out that her father was killed by a man named Diwan. Before she could think of taking any further action, Diwan and his men track her down - their goal to find the secret location of the diamonds hidden by Dhanraj - and kill anyone who dares to get in their way.

Cast
Randhir Kapoor as Gopal
Mumtaz as Sapna Dhanraj
Pran as Lal
Asha Sachdev as Leena
D. K. Sapru as Dhanraj
Anwar Hussain as Diwan Chamanlal
Ram Mohan as Tiger
Manorama as Mrs. Rana

Music

External links
 

1975 films
1970s Hindi-language films
Films scored by Laxmikant–Pyarelal
Films directed by Harmesh Malhotra